Yiorgos Veltsos (born October 1944) is a Greek philosopher, author, poet, and former academic professor.

Biography
Veltsos was born in Athens, Greece. He studied Law at the Aristotle University of Thessaloniki and received his doctoral degree in Political Sociology from the University of Vincennes in Saint-Denis. From 1975 onward, Veltsos taught communication theory at the Panteion University in Athens, where he became associate professor in 1980, and professor of Sociology in 1985.

A collection of Veltsos's theatrical works have been published in French with a foreword by Jacques Derrida. Selections of his poetry have been translated into English, French and German. In his discussions of social institutions and ideology, he often took a semiotic point of view.

Over the years, and since the 1970s, Veltsos has written as a guest columnist on various subjects, including travel or food, mainly in the daily newspaper Ta Nea. In the 1990s, he initiated and was featured in a series of interviews with European philosophers, such as Felix Guattari, for state television in Greece.

In 2012, Veltsos was named chevalier des Arts et des Lettres by the French state.

Selected bibliography
Skia/Shadow, Athens: Indiktos 2004, 149pp,  (in English)
Humus. Camera degli sposi, Athènes: Institut Français d'Athènes, 2000, 163pp,  (in French)

In Greek
 (Sociology of Institutions: The Institutional Logos and Power), 1977
 (Sociology of Institutions: Family and Imaginary Relations), 1979
 (The Monstrous Side), 1985
 (To Cornelius Castoriadis), 1989
 (The Prototype has been Lost), 2001
 1993–2005 (Poems 1993–2005), 2006
 (Dream Protocols), 2013

References

External links
Magda Goebbels by George Veltsos, National Theatre of Greece

1944 births
Politicians from Athens
20th-century Greek philosophers
University of Paris alumni
Living people
Academic staff of Panteion University